Rodolfo Gavinelli (1891 or 1 January 1895 – 1921) was an Italian footballer who played as a forward. On 9 April 1911, he represented the Italy national football team on the occasion of a friendly match against France in a 2–2 away draw; as his date of birth is uncertain, he is the youngest unofficial player to start and feature in a match for Italy. His given name is also uncertain, with some sources stating it is Pietro Antonio instead of Rodolfo.

References

Date of birth uncertain
1921 deaths
Italian footballers
Italy international footballers
Association football forwards
1890s births